La Nuit porte-jarretelles (English title: The Night Wears Suspenders) is a 1985 French film directed by Virginie Thévenet. The film stars Jezabel Carpi, Ariel Genet and Arielle Dombasle.

Synopsis
A young woman leads a timid and innocent young man in an initiation and exploration of Paris by night.

Analysis
The film is an odd mixture, with Rohmerian cast and dialogues, mixed with a complacent night tour of the red-light districts of Paris, bordering on sexploitation.

La Nuit porte-jarretelles got a César Award nomination (Best First Work) in 1986.

External links
 
 

1985 films
1980s romance films
French romance films
1980s French films